Muddy Run is a  tributary of the Conodoguinet Creek in Franklin County, Pennsylvania in the United States.

The  tributary Rowe Run joins Muddy Run southeast of Orrstown.

The  tributary Lehman Run joins the Muddy Run near Pleasant Hall, Pennsylvania.

The headwaters begin in the Letterkenny Army Depot. Muddy Run joins the Conodoguinet near Orrstown.

See also
List of rivers of Pennsylvania

References

External links
U.S. Geological Survey: PA stream gaging stations

Rivers of Pennsylvania
Tributaries of the Susquehanna River
Rivers of Franklin County, Pennsylvania